The Sint Janskerk in Gouda, the Netherlands, is a large Gothic church, known especially for its stained glass windows, for which it has been placed on the list of the top 100 Dutch monuments.

History
The church is dedicated to John the Baptist, the patron saint of Gouda, and was built during the 15th and 16th centuries. In 1552 a large part of the church burned, including the archives. Most information of the early period is taken from the diaries of Ignatius Walvis. Around 1350 a tower was built (only the lower part remains). In 1485 the foundation was built for the present-day choir. This expansion made the church the longest in the Netherlands, with a length of 123 meters.

The stained glass windows were made and installed primarily by the brothers Dirk and Wouter Crabeth I, in the years 1555-1571, and after a short stop for the Protestant Reformation, until 1603. During the Reformation the church was spared, because the city fathers sided with the reigning king Philip II of Spain, rather than William the Silent, representing the Orange rebels. Later, after the orangists conquered the northern half of Holland, Gouda reverted to Orange in 1572. It was only during this period that the church was in danger, and three weeks later an angry mob stormed the church and plundered the contents, but left the windows intact. The church was closed, but many wealthy regents of the city attempted to have it reopened. In 1573 the Gouda council prohibited the practice of Roman Catholic religion and in the summer it was opened for the Protestant Dutch Reformed faith, which it still has today.

In 1954 the Van der Vorm chapel was added to house the 7 regulierenglazen from the Monastery of the Clerks Regular (Regulierenklooster) in Gouda. In earlier days this Monastery, in which Erasmus lived from 1486-1491, was located in the land van Stein (in the neighborhood of Gouda). Relocation to Gouda, in 1551, was necessary for safety reasons. The 7 panes were in that period (1556-1559) designed and placed in the monastery chapel. When the monastery was demolished in 1580 the panes were moved to the Sint Janskerk. They were initially placed in positions 20 and 21. After restoration they were moved to the newly build Van der Vorm chapel.

In 1939 the stained glass was removed in anticipation of war with Germany. Later during the war, in 1944, when 51,000 men were called for service from Schiedam and Rotterdam, about 2800 were marched to Gouda, where they spent the night in this church on November 10.

The church tower contains an historic carillon, currently played by Boudewijn Zwart and formerly played by Maria Blom from 1943-1985. The carillon was originally installed in 1676, with 37 bells cast by Hemony, of which 16 have survived. In 1966, the Royal Eijsbouts Bell Foundry enlarged the carillon with 33 bells, bringing the total to 50 bells. The carillon also includes a bell cast by Hendrick Wegewaert in 1605.

See also
List of stained glass windows in the Janskerk, Gouda

Notes

References 
Walvis, Ignatius "Beschryving der stad Gouda". Leiden 1714, reprint 1972, Nieuwendijk : Publisher de Forel.
 Xander van Eck, Christiane E. Coebergh-Surie, Andrea C. Gasten: The stained-glass windows in the Sint Janskerk at Gouda II: The works of Dirck and Wouter Crabeth, Koninklijke Nederlandse Akademie van Wetenschappen, Amsterdam 2002, 
 R.A. Bosch: The 72 stained glass windows of Saint John's Church in Gouda, 2008,

External links 

 site of the St. Janskerk with virtual tour

16th-century churches in the Netherlands
Bell towers in the Netherlands
Carillons
Churches in South Holland
Gouda, South Holland
Rijksmonuments in South Holland
Stained glass
Towers in South Holland